Alloharpina is a genus of moths in the family Geometridae. The genus was described by Wehrli in 1941.

Species
Alloharpina dolosaria Leech
Alloharpina conjungens Alphéraky, 1892
Alloharpina dejeani Oberthür, 1884
Alloharpina discoidalis Wehrli, 1941
Alloharpina percostata Wehrli, 1939

References

Ennominae
Geometridae genera